The Nokia 3610 is a mobile phone released in 2001 by Nokia.

References

Mobile phones introduced in 2002
3610